David S. Powars  is a Research Geologist with the United States Geological Survey at the Geology and Paleoclimate Science Center, in  Reston, Virginia.

He is credited as a principal discoverer of the Chesapeake Bay impact crater.    He is the task leader of geological investigation of Coastal Plain (CP) deposits in Chesapeake Bay Region (as part of the Atlantic Watershed Project).

Awards
He received the  Virginia Museum of Natural History’s Thomas Jefferson Award for outstanding contributions to science in Virginia.

References

External links
 Interview from NPR

Living people
Year of birth missing (living people)
Place of birth missing (living people)
American geologists
United States Geological Survey personnel